Külitse is a small borough in Kambja Parish, Tartu County, in southern Estonia. It is located about 6 km southwest of the city of Tartu by the Tartu–Valga–Riga railway and the European route E264 (also known as Via Hanseatica). Külitse has a population of 600 (as of 1 September 2010).

Külitse was first mentioned in 1582 as Kilicz.

In the beginning of the 1970s a reservoir known as Ropka Lake was created in the village.

Külitse is served by Edelaraudtee's Ropka station which is located on the border of Külitse and Laane villages.

References

Boroughs and small boroughs in Estonia